Osmoxylon miquelii is a species of plant in the family Araliaceae. It is endemic to West Papua (Indonesia).

References

miquelii
Endemic flora of Western New Guinea
Data deficient plants
Taxonomy articles created by Polbot